Lithosia yuennanensis is a moth of the family Erebidae. It was described by Franz Daniel in 1952. It is found in Yunnan, China.

References

Lithosiina
Moths described in 1952
Moths of Asia